Morro Velho, also called AngloGold Ashanti Brasil Mineração, after its current owner AngloGold Ashanti, is a complex of gold mines located near the city of Nova Lima in the Minas Gerais state of Brazil.

It is one of two mining operations of the company in Brazil, the other being the Serra Grande Gold Mine.

In 2008, the Brazilian operations contributed 8% to the company's overall production.

History
The mines have been in operation since 1725 and came under the proprietorship of the English Saint John Del Rey Mining Company in 1834. In this period the mine was amongst others instrumental in the establishment of a hydro-electrical power plant, a state of the art hospital, the Villa Nova AC association football team, which had some importance between the 1930s and 1970s and the construction of a circa 10 kilometre tramway line between Nova Lima and Raposos, considered the first in South America.

In 1915, the Morro Velho mine reached a vertical depth of 5,824 feet, which made it the deepest mine in the world. The miners continued going deeper, and the mine kept the title of world’s deepest until 1928, when the Village Deep mine in South Africa reached a vertical depth of 8,000 feet, exceeding the depth of the Morro Velho, which was 7,126 feet in 1929. The mine changed its ownership later on to the Carvalhaes family.

In 1975 the South Africa based Anglo American Corporation, a precursor to today's AshantiGold, became owners of the operations. These days Morro Velhos is the world's oldest continuously worked mine. Some of the mines' works are over 3,000 meters (9,800 ft) deep underground. Although Morro Velho's main production is gold, silver, arsenic, and other minerals are also extracted at the mining complex.

Despite closing of the Minha Velha and Engenho D'Água mines in 2003 and 2004, gold production has increased over the past three years, with 240,000 ounces (6,800 kilograms) of gold produced in 2004 at an average recovered ore grade of 0.222 ounces per ton (7.62 grams per metric ton). Cash costs of production totalled $133 per ounce, with the mine realizing adjusted operating profit of $45 million.

In 2009, the mine employed close to 3,000 people, 2,250 of those being permanent staff.

Production
Recent production figures of the mine were:

Images

References

External links 

 AngloGold Ashanti website
 AngloGold Ashanti: Country report Brazil
 Jolyon Ralph, Ida Chau: Morro Velho mine, Nova Lima, Iron Quadrangle, Minas Gerais, Brazil, Mindat.org (per 2014-05-20).
 Augusto Wagner: A fundação do Villa Nova, Arquivo Campeões do Futebol, 2012-06-28.
 Centro de Memória Morro Velho: Respeito ao passado, referência para o presente e inspiração para inovações futuras., AngloGold Ashanti, 2010.

Gold mines in Brazil
Silver mines in Brazil
Arsenic mines in Brazil
Underground mines in Brazil
AngloGold Ashanti
Buildings and structures in Minas Gerais
Geography of Minas Gerais